The Bobs is the debut studio album by American a cappella vocal group the Bobs, released in 1983 by Kaleidoscope Records. The group's music is sometimes referred to as New Wave A Cappella. The vocal arrangement of "Helter Skelter" was nominated for a Grammy Award in 1984.

Track listing 
All songs written by Gunnar Madsen and Richard Greene except as indicated:

LP 
 "Art for Art's Sake" – 2:58
 "Prisoner of Funk" – 4:03
 "I Hate the Beach Boys" – 3:11
 "Bus Plunge" – 2:36
 "Cowboy Lips" – 3:26
 "Helter Skelter" (Lennon, McCartney) – 1:52
 "Through the Wall" – 3:55
 "Be My Yoko" – 2:20
 "Lazy Susan" – 3:04
 "Trash" – 3:33
 "The Deprogrammer" – 4:43

CD 
 "Art for Art's Sake" – 2:58
 "Prisoner of Funk" – 4:03
 "I Hate The Beach Boys" – 3:11 
 "Bus Plunge" – 2:36
 "Cowboy Lips" – 3:26
 "Helter Skelter" (Lennon, McCartney) – 1:52
 "Through the Wall" – 3:55
 "Be My Yoko" (Pritchard) – 2:20
 "Lazy Susan" – 3:04
 "Nose to Nose" – 2:02
 "Trash" – 3:33
 "The Deprogrammer" – 4:43
 "Eddie the Jinx" – 3:22
 "Democratic Process" – 2:23
 "Psycho Killer" (Byrne, Weymouth, Frantz) – 3:27

Personnel
Credits are adapted from The Bobs liner notes.
 Gunnar "Bob" Madsen – vocals
 Matthew "Bob" Stull – vocals
 Janie "Bob" Scott – vocals (except "Eddie the Jinx")
 Richard "Bob" Greene – vocals
 Madsen/Greene – vocoder and keyboards
 Brad Bill Horn – drums on "Eddie the Jinx"

References

External links

The Bobs albums
1983 albums